The Iberian magpie (Cyanopica cooki) is  a bird in the crow family. It belongs to the genus Cyanopica.

Names
Other common names include Iberian azure-winged magpie, Cook's azure-winged magpie, and Spanish azure-winged magpie.

Description
It has a glossy black top to the head and a white throat. The underparts and the back are a light grey-fawn in colour with the wings and the feathers of the long (16–20 cm) tail are an azure blue.

Distribution and habitat
The Iberian magpie occurs in southwestern and central parts of the Iberian Peninsula, in Spain and Portugal. However, it can sometimes be spotted also in south-western France, and recently its presence has been reported even in north-western Italy. It inhabits various types of coniferous (mainly pine) and broadleaf forest, including parks and gardens in the eastern populations.

Taxonomy
This taxon is sometimes treated as conspecific with the azure-winged magpie (C. cyana), but this population is 5400 miles (9,000 km) away from those in eastern Asia. Genetic analyses have suggested that Iberian and azure-winged magpies are distinct at species level.

Behaviour and ecology

Often Iberian magpies find food as a family group or several groups making flocks of up to 70 birds. The largest groups congregate after the breeding season and throughout the winter months. Their diet consists mainly of acorns (oak seeds) and pine nuts, extensively supplemented by invertebrates and their larvae, soft fruits and berries, and also human-provided scraps in parks and towns.

This species usually nests in loose, open colonies with a single nest in each tree, same   Mean clutch size is 6.2 eggs, but only 32% of nesting attempts are successful, with an average 5.1 young fledged.

References

Iberian magpie
Birds of Southern Europe
Fauna of the Iberian Peninsula
Iberian magpie
Iberian magpie